66th parallel may refer to:

66th parallel north, a circle of latitude in the Northern Hemisphere
66th parallel south, a circle of latitude in the Southern Hemisphere